Ethiopia was formerly one of Africa's major forces, and played in every Africa Cup of Nations until the end of 1960s. Ethiopia themselves also won an AFCON tournament, the 1962 edition, when they were the hosts. Since then, success has started to fade from Ethiopia's football and after 1982, Ethiopia would have to wait until 2013, when the country qualified for the final tournament after a 31-year absence.

Overall record

Matches

Sudan 1957

Semifinals

Final

United Arab Republic 1959

Ethiopia 1962

Semifinals

Final

Ghana 1963

Group stage

Third place

Tunisia 1965

Group stage

Ethiopia 1968

Group stage

Semi-finals

Third place

Sudan 1970

Group stage

Ethiopia 1976

Group stage

Libya 1982

Group stage

South Africa 2013

Group stage

Cameroon 2021

Group stage

References

External links
Africa Cup of Nations – Archives competitions – cafonline.com

 
Ethiopia national football team